Niels Pedersen (5 August 1888 – 4 January 1968) was a Danish racewalker. He competed in the 10 kilometres walk at the 1912 Summer Olympics and the 1920 Summer Olympics.

References

Further reading
 Pederson, Niels (1888-1968) at Kolding.dk (via Wayback Machine)

1888 births
1968 deaths
Athletes (track and field) at the 1912 Summer Olympics
Athletes (track and field) at the 1920 Summer Olympics
Danish male racewalkers
Olympic athletes of Denmark
Place of birth missing